Catenulispora fulva is a bacterium from the genus of Catenulispora which has been isolated from forest soil from Chungnam in Korea.

References

Actinomycetia
Bacteria described in 2016